The designations W Centauri and w Centauri refer to two different stars in the constellation Centaurus.

W Centauri, the variable star designation for the faint Mira variable HD 103513
HD 110458, a red giant also known by its Latin-letter Bayer designation w Centauri

See also
ω Centauri

Centaurus (constellation)